Eddie Paul Mayne (September 16, 1945 – November 25, 2007) was an American politician from Utah. A Democrat, he was a member of the Utah State Senate, representing the state's 5th senate district in West Valley City.

Early life and education 

Mayne studied at Snow College and the University of Utah. He worked for Kennecott Utah Copper in the Bingham Canyon Mine after his first year in college.

Labor leader 

In 1977, at age 31, he became the youngest person to win election to the state presidency of the AFL-CIO, a position he held until his death.

Politics 

Mayne was first elected to the Utah State Senate in 1994. He rose to the position of Assistant Minority Whip.

Death and tributes 

Mayne was diagnosed with lung cancer in the Spring of 2007, and died on November 25, 2007 at his home.

On September 19, 2008, the Hunter High School football stadium, in West Valley City, Utah, was named 'Ed Mayne Stadium' for his support in getting funding for stadium lights as well as for other athletics in the school.

References 

1945 births
2007 deaths
Latter Day Saints from Utah
University of Utah alumni
Snow College alumni
Democratic Party Utah state senators
People from West Valley City, Utah
20th-century American politicians
21st-century American politicians
People from Bingham Canyon, Utah
Spouses of Utah politicians